The Zündapp Bella is a motor scooter manufactured by motorcycle manufacturer Zündapp from 1953 to 1964.

The design of the Bella was heavily influenced by that of the Parilla Levriere, also known as the Parilla Greyhound. Along with being similar in general appearance, both designs have prominent air tunnels along the centreline of the scooter to allow fresh air to cool the engine without a fan.

As introduced in 1953, the Bella had a 146 cc two-stroke single cylinder engine, 12 inch wheels, 6 V electrics, a kick starter, and an undamped telescopic fork. The fuel tank was mounted under the seat.

A version of the Bella called the Suburbanette was made for the United States market from 1953 to 1954.  The Suburbanette was stripped of the body panels enclosing the engine. 370 Suburbanettes were sold. An export version of the last 150cc Bella, the R154K (K for kickstarter), with higher "Western" (buckhorn) bars and no dynastarter, came to the United States in the later 1950s.

A  engine producing  became available in May 1954. The front suspension was later changed from a telescopic fork to an Earles-type leading link fork with a single suspension unit on left side of the fork. Later Bella scooters also had 12 V electricals powered by two 6 V batteries. Electric starters also became available on the Bella.

The Bella was imported into the United Kingdom by Ambassador Motorcycles, and into the United States by International Motorcycle Company.

See also
List of motorcycles of the 1950s

References

External links

 – Zündapp Bella test ride
 – 360° view of Zündapp Bella

Motorcycles of Germany
Motor scooters
Motorcycles introduced in 1953
Two-stroke motorcycles
Zündapp